Koulikoro (also spelled Kouroukoro) is a village in western Ivory Coast. It is in the sub-prefecture of Gbonné, Biankouma Department, Tonkpi Region, Montagnes District. The area is mostly covered by rainforest.

History
On 14 July 1749 an annular solar eclipse took place around the village. 2 kilometres away, the greatest eclipse of the day occurred.  and lasted 4 minutes, 46 seconds at 12:19 UTC.

Koulikoro was a commune until March 2012, when it was abolished along with 1126 other communes in the country.

Notes

Former communes of Ivory Coast
Populated places in Montagnes District
Populated places in Tonkpi